The 2022 Supercars Championship (known for commercial reasons as the 2022 Repco Supercars Championship) was a motor racing series for Supercars. It was the twenty-fourth running of the Supercars Championship and the twenty-sixth series in which Supercars have contested the Australian Touring Car Championship, the premier title in Australian motorsport.

Shane van Gisbergen successfully defended the Drivers' Championship, claiming his third title. In a display of dominance throughout the season, he broke the record for the most wins in a single season with 21 wins, eclipsing Scott McLaughlin's record of 18 wins in 2019. Triple Eight Race Engineering successfully defended the Teams' Championship. Holden won their final Manufacturers' Championship at The Bend SuperSprint.

Teams and drivers 
The following teams and drivers competed in the 2022 championship.

Team changes
The field expanded from 24 to 25 cars after Supercars management sold a dormant Teams Racing Charter (TRC) to Tickford Racing. The TRC will be used to run the #56 entry for Jake Kostecki.

The Grove Group took full ownership of Kelly Grove Racing, re-naming the team to Grove Racing.

Peter Xiberras, managing director of PremiAir Hire, purchased Team Sydney and renamed it PremiAir Racing.

Driver changes
Jamie Whincup retired from full-time competition at the end of the 2021 season and replaced Roland Dane as team principal and managing director of Triple Eight Race Engineering. 2021 Super2 Series champion Broc Feeney graduated to replace Whincup. Whincup returned as a endurance co-driver alongside Feeney.

Thomas Randle moved up to the series full time with Tickford Racing, having raced as a wildcard in several events for the team in both 2019 and 2021.

Jake Kostecki and Zane Goddard left Matt Stone Racing, with Kostecki replacing Jack Le Brocq at Tickford Racing. Le Brocq joined Matt Stone Racing in a straight driver swap. Todd Hazelwood also returned to the team, having last raced for them in 2019. Zane Goddard was unable to raise sufficient sponsorship to compete full-time in 2022. He returned as an endurance co-driver for Tickford Racing.

Bryce Fullwood left Walkinshaw Andretti United to replace Hazelwood at Brad Jones Racing, with Fullwood's seat filled by Nick Percat, who returned to Walkinshaw, a team he last raced for in 2014 under James Rosenberg Racing.

Andre Heimgartner left Grove Racing to replace Nick Percat at Brad Jones Racing. He was replaced by Lee Holdsworth.

Chris Pither returned to the championship, replacing Fabian Coulthard who was dropped from the PremiAir Racing driver line-up. Coulthard joined Walkinshaw Andretti United as an endurance co-driver.

Mid Season changes 
Garry Jacobson left PremiAir Racing after the Darwin Triple Crown round and was replaced by James Golding, who last raced full time in 2019.

Calendar 

Thirteen circuits hosted a round of the 2022 championship.

Calendar changes 

Albert Park, Auckland, Gold Coast, Newcastle, Perth and Winton returned after absence due to the COVID-19 pandemic.

The Adelaide 500 returned to the calendar after being cancelled in 2021 following the result of the 2022 South Australian state election.

Impact of COVID-19 pandemic 
The Newcastle 500 was cancelled due to the COVID-19 Omicron outbreak in New South Wales. Sydney Motorsport Park hosted the opening round of the championship, as Sydney SuperNight.

Series changes

Rule changes 
The red flag rule during qualifying was amended. Previously if a driver caused a red flag in the session, their fastest time was deleted and they were ruled out for the remainder of the session. Now if a driver causes a red flag and is able to bring the car back to the pits, their fastest lap gets deleted, but they are now able to resume being a part of the session. This comes after Cameron Waters brought out the red flag at the second Sydney Motorsport Park round in 2021 and was able to return to the pits under his own power.

Results

Season summary

Points

Points system
Points were awarded for each race at an event, to the driver or drivers of a car that completed at least 75% of the race distance and was running at the completion of the race. At least 50% of the planned race distance must be completed for the result to be valid and championship points awarded. No extra points were awarded if the fastest lap time is achieved by a driver who was classified outside the top fifteen.

Bathurst: Used for the Bathurst 1000.
Two-race: Used for the Sydney SuperNight, Townsville 500, Gold Coast 500 and Adelaide 500.
SuperSprint: Used for all SuperSprint races, the Perth SuperNight and Darwin Triple Crown.
Melbourne: Used for the Melbourne 400.

Drivers' Championship

Teams' Championship

Notes

References

External links

Supercars Championship seasons
Supercars